Souleymane Coulibaly (born 8 August 1996) is a Malian professional footballer, who plays for Stade Malien.

External links 
 

1996 births
Living people
Malian footballers
Mali under-20 international footballers
Association football defenders
Malian expatriate footballers
2015 Africa U-23 Cup of Nations players
AS Real Bamako players
Club Africain players
Aiginiakos F.C. players
Stade Malien players
Tunisian Ligue Professionnelle 1 players
Mali international footballers
Malian expatriate sportspeople in Tunisia
Malian expatriate sportspeople in Greece
Expatriate footballers in Tunisia
Expatriate footballers in Greece
21st-century Malian people
Mali A' international footballers
2022 African Nations Championship players